The second season of the Peruvian reality television show Bailando por un Sueño was won by the partnership of Marco Zunino and Jardenia Ugaz.

Cast

Scores

2008 Peruvian television seasons